"Spaceman" is a song by the Killers. The song was released as the second single from the band's third studio album Day & Age on November 4, 2008, as a digital download on iTunes, and as 7" and promo CD in the US, Canada and UK. It has been released to radio in Australia and has gone into regular rotation on Triple J. This song was number 17 on Rolling Stones list of the 100 Best Songs of 2008. The song has been used regularly as the opening song during the band's tour.

Live performances
The group began performing the song at shows during their summer 2008 tour and played it as part of a two-song set on the October 4, 2008, episode of Saturday Night Live. They also performed the song on November 4, 2008, on BBC2's Later... with Jools Holland.

Popular culture
The song was featured in the Fringe episode "The No-Brainer", as well as on the trailer of the animated film Planet 51 starring Dwayne "The Rock" Johnson. The song was also released as a downloadable track for the music video game series Rock Band on November 25, 2008.

Radio performance
In the Los Angeles market, "Spaceman" was a big radio hit, with radio-airplay longevity into 2010.  On KYSR 98.7 FM, it was their #1 most-played song in June 2010, while KROQ 106.7 FM added the song back into regular rotation in May 2010 due to its regional popularity.

Music video
The music video was directed by American director Ray Tintori, and shows Brandon Flowers walking around a party in progress, happening on a unique tiered structure adorned with long white vertical lights. Many humanoid creatures (all dressed up in very colourful, carnival-like costumes) are dancing, occasionally as a group, but usually individually. The other three band members can also be seen at the party throughout the video. As more of the structure is revealed, it can be seen that it is in the middle of a wide open space, surrounded by the camera crew filming the video.

Track list
Promo CD
"Spaceman" (radio edit) – 4:13
"Spaceman" (album version) – 4:44

UK 7" Picture Disc
"Spaceman" – 4:44
"Tidal Wave" – 4:14

Limited Edition 12" Picture Disc
"Spaceman" – 4:44
"Four Winds" (Conor Oberst) – 3:56

German CD/German iTunes EP
"Spaceman" - 4:44
"Four Winds" (Conor Oberst) - 3:56
"Tidal Wave" - 4:14

Promo Remix CD
"Spaceman" (Bimbo Jones vocal mix) – 8:04
"Spaceman" (Bimbo Jones dub) – 8:03
"Spaceman" (Bimbo Jones radio edit) – 4:33

Promo Remix CD 2
"Spaceman" (Bimbo Jones Radio Mix) – 04:33
"Spaceman" (Bimbo Jones Vocal Mix) – 08:05
"Spaceman" (Lee Dagger Club Mix) – 09:03
"Spaceman" (Max Jackson Dub) – 06:26
"Spaceman" (Sander van Doorn Remix Part 1) – 06:38
"Spacemen" (Sander van Doorn Remix Part 2) – 07:39
"Spaceman" (Tiësto Remix) - 7:07

Chart performance
"Spaceman" debuted on the Billboard Hot 100 at number 67 on November 22, 2008.  The song fell off the chart the following week.
On Sunday 16 February 2009, "Spaceman" finally broke into the UK Top 40 at number 40.

Charts

Weekly charts

Year-end charts

Certifications

Release history

References

External links
Music video at youtube.com

The Killers songs
2008 singles
Songs written by Brandon Flowers
Songs written by Dave Keuning
Songs written by Ronnie Vannucci Jr.
Songs written by Mark Stoermer
Song recordings produced by Stuart Price
2008 songs
Island Records singles